Blue Sky Blue may refer to:

 "Blue Sky Blue" (Feeder song), 2019
 "Blue Sky Blue" (Rythem song), 2003
 Blue Sky Blue (album), a 2011 studio album by Pete Murray, or its title track
 Blue Sky Blue "The Byron Sessions", a 2013 studio album by Murray